The Buck Stops Here is an album by saxophonist Buck Hill which was recorded in 1990 and released on the Muse label.

Reception

The AllMusic review by Les Line stated "he shares the solo spotlight with the rarely recorded Johnny Coles, who seldom plays a superfluous note on his warm-voiced flugelhorn. This is a nicely balanced set of pretty ballads and jaunty originals".

Track listing
 "Someone Like That in Your Life" (Buck Hill, Chips Bayen) – 5:24
 "I've Grown Accustomed to Her Face" (Frederick Loewe, Alan Jay Lerner) – 6:36
 "Breaks" (Hill) – 7:11
 "Harlem Nocturne" (Earle Hagen, Dick Rogers) – 6:25	
 "Wip Wap" (Johnny Coles) – 6:05
 "You Don't Know What Love Is" (Gene de Paul, Don Raye) – 8:53
 "R H Blues" (Hill) – 3:41
 "I Don't Stand a Ghost of a Chance with You" (Victor Young, Ned Washington, Bing Crosby) – 7:54

Personnel
Buck Hill – tenor saxophone
Johnny Coles – flugelhorn
Barry Harris – piano 
Ray Drummond – bass 
Kenny Washington – drums

References

Muse Records albums
Buck Hill (musician) albums
1992 albums
Albums recorded at Van Gelder Studio